The United States Preventive Services Task Force (USPSTF) is "an independent panel of experts in primary care and prevention that systematically reviews the evidence of effectiveness and develops recommendations for clinical preventive services". The task force, a volunteer panel of primary care clinicians (including those from internal medicine, pediatrics, family medicine, obstetrics and gynecology, nursing, and psychology) with methodology experience including epidemiology, biostatistics, health services research, decision sciences, and health economics, is funded, staffed, and appointed by the U.S. Department of Health and Human Services' Agency for Healthcare Research and Quality.

Intent
The USPSTF evaluates scientific evidence to determine whether medical screenings, counseling, and preventive medications work for adults and children who have no symptoms.

Methods
The methods of evidence synthesis used by the Task Force have been described in detail. In 2007, their methods were revised.

No weight given to cost-effectiveness 
The USPSTF explicitly does not consider cost as a factor in its recommendations, and it does not perform cost-effectiveness analyses. American health insurance groups are required to cover, at no charge to the patient, any service that the USPSTF recommends, regardless of how much it costs or how small the benefit is.

Grade definitions
The task force assigns the letter grades A, B, C, D, or I to each of its recommendations, and includes "suggestions for practice" for each grade. The Task Force also defined levels of certainty regarding net benefit.

Levels of certainty vary from high to low according to the evidence.

 High: Consistent results from well-designed studies in representative populations that assess the effect of the service on health outcomes. 
 Moderate: The evidence is sufficient to determine the effects of the service, but confidence is limited. The conclusion might change as more information becomes available. 
 Low: The evidence is insufficient to assess effects on health outcome.

Recommended prevention 
The USPSTF has evaluated many interventions for prevention and found several have an expected net benefit in the general population.  
 Aspirin in men 45 to 79 and women 55 to 79 for cardiovascular disease
 Colon cancer screening by colonoscopy, occult blood testing, or sigmoidoscopy in adults 45 to 75.
 Low-dose CT scans for adults 55 to 80 at increased risk of lung cancer
 Osteoporosis screening via bone dual-energy X-ray absorptiometry (DEXA) in women over 65

Breast cancer screening
In 2009, the USPSTF updated its advice for screening mammograms. Screening mammograms, or routine mammograms, are X-rays given to apparently healthy women with no symptoms or evidence of breast cancer in the hope of detecting the disease in an early, easily treatable stage.  The advice about using mammography in the presence of symptoms (such as a lump in the breast that can be felt) is unchanged.

The previous advice was for all women over the age of 40 to receive a mammogram every one to two years.  The new advice is more detailed. For women between the ages of 50 and 74, they have recommended routine mammograms once every two years in the absence of symptoms.  Most American women who are diagnosed with breast cancer are diagnosed after age 60.

The USPSTF declared that there is insufficient evidence to make any statement about the use of mammograms in women over the age of 75, as very little research has been performed in this age group.

The Task Force made no recommendation about routine mammography to screen asymptomatic women aged 40 to 49 years for breast cancer.  Patients in this age group should be educated about the risks and benefits of screening, and the decision whether to screen or not should be based on the individual situation and preferences. The old advice was based on "weak" evidence for this age group. The new advice is based on improved scientific evidence about the benefits and harms associated with mammography and is consistent with recommendations by the World Health Organization and other major medical bodies.  Their recommendation against routine, suspicion-less mammograms for younger women does not change the advice for screening women at above-average risk for developing breast cancer or for testing women who have a suspicious lump or any other symptoms that might be related to breast cancer.

The change in the recommendation for younger women has been criticized by some physicians and cancer advocacy groups, such as Otis Brawley, the chief medical officer for the American Cancer Society, and praised by physicians and medical organizations that support individualized and evidence-based medicine, such as Donna Sweet, the former chair of the American College of Physicians, who currently serves on its Clinical Efficacy Assessment Subcommittee.

The USPSTF recommendation, which focuses solely on clinical effectiveness without regard to cost, formally reduces the grade given for evidence quality from "B" to "C" (limited evidence prevents a one-size-fits-all recommendation) for routine mammograms in women under the age of 50. With a grade C recommendation, physicians are required to consider additional factors, such as the individual woman's personal risk of breast cancer. Pending health care legislation would require insurance companies to cover any and all preventive services that receive an "A" or "B" grade, but permit them to use discretion on preventive services that receive a worse grade.

The Vitter amendment to the Mikulski amendment to pending legislation in the U.S. Senate instructs insurers to disregard the task force's recommendation against frequent routine mammograms in asymptomatic younger women, and requires them to provide free annual mammograms, even for low-risk women, based on the outdated 2002 report. This proposal is not yet law and may change.  The efforts by politicians to reject the committee's scientific findings have been condemned as an example of unwarranted political interference in scientific research.

Prostate cancer screening

In the current recommendation published in 2018, the Task Force recommended that prostate-specific antigen (PSA)-based screening for prostate cancer screenings be an individual decision for men between the ages of 55 to 69. In 2018 the Task Force gave PCa screening a C recommendation.

A final statement published in 2018 recommends basing the decision to screen on shared decision making in those 55 to 69 years old. It continues to recommend against screening in those 70 and older.

History
The initial USPSTF was created in 1984 as a 5 year appointment to "develop recommendations for primary care clinicians on the appropriate content of periodic health examinations" and was modelled on the Canadian Task Force on Preventive Health Care, established in 1976.  This initial 5 year project concluded in 1989 with the release of their report, the Guide to Clinical Preventive Services.   In July 1990, the Department of Health and Human Services reconstituted the Task Force to continue and update these scientific assessments of preventive services.

References

External links
 USPSTF on Agency for Healthcare Research and Quality (AHRQ) website
 USPSTF website

Preventive Services Task Force
Task forces
Agencies of the United States Public Health Service
United States national commissions
Health policy in the United States